Actinoscypha is a genus of fungus belonging to the family Dermateaceae.

The genus was first described by Petter Adolf Karsten in 1888.

Species:
 Actinoscypha muelleri

References

Dermateaceae
Dermateaceae genera